The discography of American indie rock band Bright Eyes consists of ten studio albums, one compilation album, one live album, two box sets, eleven extended plays, twelve split albums and EPs, 31 singles, and eleven music videos.

Albums

Studio albums

Live albums

Compilation albums

Box sets

Extended plays

Splits and collaborations

Singles

Music videos

Compilation appearances

Notes

See also
List of songs by Bright Eyes
List of songs with Conor Oberst

References

External links
Official website for Bright Eyes
https://web.archive.org/web/20060424195439/http://www.thestoryinthesoil.com/albums.html

Discographies of American artists
Rock music group discographies
Conor Oberst